Michèle Sjögren-Strebel (born 24 April 1970) is a Swiss former professional tennis player.

Strebel reached a best singles ranking of 217 in the world and was ranked as high as 128 in doubles. She twice appeared in the main-draw French Open women's doubles, in 1989 and 1991, with her best performance coming in the latter where she and partner Manuela Maleeva made the second round.

In 1992, she played in two doubles rubbers for the Switzerland Federation Cup team, the first of them with Maleeva in the first round of the World Group against Sweden, a live rubber which they lost in three sets to Maria Lindström and Maria Strandlund. She also featured for Switzerland in the subsequent World Group play-off against Paraguay and this time won in the doubles (partnering Emanuela Zardo), to round off a 3–0 win in the tie.

ITF Circuit finals

Singles: 3 (1–2)

Doubles: 8 (2–6)

See also
 List of Switzerland Fed Cup team representatives

References

External links
 
 
 

1970 births
Living people
Swiss female tennis players